The 1931 German football championship, the 24th edition of the competition, was won by Hertha BSC, defeating TSV 1860 München 3–2 in the final.

For Hertha it was the sixth consecutive final the club played in and the second national championship, having won the previous edition. Hertha thereby became only the second club after 1. FC Nürnberg to defend its title. It marked however the end of Hertha's most successful era, with the club never again playing in another German championship final after 1931, as it did for clubs from Berlin, as no other club from the German capital would ever reach another German championship final again. For TSV 1860 it was the only championship final the club ever played in, having to wait until the Bundesliga era to win a championship. The following season the club's rival, FC Bayern Munich, would take out the only national championship for the city of Munich during the pre-Bundesliga era.

Hertha's Willi Kirsei was the top scorer of the 1931 championship with seven goals.

Sixteen club qualified for the knock-out competition, two from each of the regional federations plus an additional third club from the South and West. In all cases the regional champions qualified and almost all of the runners-up, except in Central Germany where the second spot went to the regional cup winner. In the West the third spot went to the third placed team of the championship while, in the South, the third spot was determined in a separate qualifying competition for runners-up and third placed teams.

Qualified teams
The teams qualified through the regional championships:

Competition

Round of 16
The round of 16, played between 10 and 17 May 1931:

|}

Quarter-finals
The quarter-finals, played on 17 and 24 May 1931:

|}

Semi-finals
The semi-finals, played on 31 May 1931:

|}

Final
The final, played on 14 June 1931:

|}

References

Sources
 kicker Allmanach 1990, by kicker, page 164 & 177 - German championship

External links
 German Championship 1930–31 at weltfussball.de 
 German Championship 1931 at RSSSF

1
German
German football championship seasons